Eurimyia is a genus of rat-tail maggot flies in the family Syrphidae. There are three described species in Eurimyia. They were formerly members of the genus Lejops.

Species
 Eurimyia japonica (Shiraki, 1930)
 Eurimyia lineata (Fabricius, 1787) (striped swamp fly)
 Eurimyia stipata (Fabricius, 1787) (long-nosed swamp fly)

References

External links

 

Eristalinae